DeAnn (also De Ann) is an unincorporated community in Hempstead County, Arkansas, United States, north of Hope.

Unincorporated communities in Hempstead County, Arkansas
Unincorporated communities in Arkansas